Kulldorff is a surname. Notable people with the surname include:

 Gunnar Kulldorff (1927–2015), Swedish statistician
 Martin Kulldorff (born 1962), Swedish biostatistician

Swedish-language surnames